The Minidoka Irrigator was a weekly newspaper published at the Minidoka Relocation Center located in Hunt, Idaho.

Publication began on September 10, 1942  and ended on July 28, 1945. It was one of many newspapers published in 10 War Relocation Authority (WRA) relocation centers.

The newspapers served as a means for disseminating WRA rules, regulations and surveys. The WRA initially banned the use of Japanese in the newspapers but later issues sometimes included Japanese-language inserts. Newspaper articles cover a wide range of topics including daily activities, beauty tips, diet and nutrition, crime and law enforcement, education, hobbies, social activities and sports.

See also
Manzanar Free Press

References

Internment of Japanese Americans
World War II and the media
Defunct newspapers published in Idaho
Defunct weekly newspapers
Japanese-American press